Swatar, colloquially known as Is-Swatar and Tas-Swatar, is a hamlet in Malta situated in Birkirkara and in Msida. In 2015 it had a population of over 5,100 people, with around 1,600 families. Swatar has its own separate parish since 8 November 2006, by an official decree issued by the Bishop of Malta Monsignor Paul Cremona.

Swatar is located on a hill. It is in the proximity to Mater Dei Hospital and the University of Malta which are found in an area in Msida known as Tal-Qroqq. Swatar is also found next to Tal-Qattus and Ta' Paris areas in Birkirkara. The hamlet has been consisting of mainly farmlands until most of the 20th century.

Some buildings, such as farmhouses, were built during the rule of the Order of St. John. Most of the buildings today were built sometimes after World War II and consist of modern neighborhoods. Some significant economic activity takes place on the side of Birkirkara Bypass.

History
Swatar has been an agricultural land since the Arab period in Malta when it was not considered as a reference area on its own. During the Order of St. John the area remained largely uninhabited but the areas in the surroundings were both agricultural and hunting zones. The area started to be populated mostly after World War II when several families started to settle out of the cities. The Government of Malta has given financial advantages to acquire and build land in the 1970s and 1980s for families who moved to live there; with similar schemes around Malta.

Swatar has had its own spiritual service, by the Roman Catholic Church, since 1989, and became a separate parish in 2008. The current parish priest is Fr Robert Grech. The patron of the church is Saint George Preca, a Maltese. 

The area has its own social gathering groups such as the Society of Christian Doctrine (M.U.S.E.U.M), the Żgħażagħ Azzjoni Kattolika (ŻAK) and a relative new pastoral center. 

The pastoral center includes the parish church, a community gathering garden, a car park and a farmhouse. The farmhouse host three main community gathering being; the Adoration Chapel, the house of the parish priest and the gathering place of the ŻAK. The farmhouse is a vernacular building and is one of the oldest buildings in Swatar. It has gone under different adaptive reuse and structural changes. The carpark is not for general public use.

There is a public garden, named Swatar Garden, which is situated at Balliju Guttenberg Street. The garden is equipped with European standard facilities such as; a 5-a-side football ground, energy efficient lightning and safety and security measures.

Swatar hosts a relative large number of companies, banks and other investments, which are mainly situated overlooking the Mater Dei Hospital on Birkirkara Bypass. Banks include the headquarters of the APS Bank and the HSBC Bank Call Centre. 

There was a Meditation Centre for some Asian communities in Malta until September 2014 but it was closed for not having legal permits by the Malta Environment and Planning Authority (MEPA). Swatar is a common housing rental area specifically for students attending the University of Malta, that are from Gozo or are on Erasmus Programme.

Governance
Swatar remains an integral part under the Birkirkara and Msida Local Councils, however it has its own administration being the Swatar Administrative Committee. The Labour Party generally gains the popular vote.

Gallery
Community buildings

Farmhouses and farmlands

Agricultural lands and stables

Residential buildings

Public gardens and landscaping

Business buildings

Schools
St. Martin's College 
International School of Beauty Therapy
International School of Hairdressing
Malta Sailing Academy, as part of RYA Sea School

Businesses
Maypole, as part of a chain of groceries (closed)
Tower Business Centre

References

Populated places in Malta
Birkirkara
Msida